Ian Beale is a fictional character from the BBC soap opera EastEnders, played by Adam Woodyatt. He is the drama's longest-serving main character and, following the departure of Pauline Fowler (Wendy Richard) in 2006, became the only one to have appeared continuously from its inception. The character appeared in his 2,000th episode in the show on 26 March 2007, and his 3,000th on 27 May 2016. After 36 years on the show, Woodyatt departed EastEnders on 22 January 2021. He made an unannounced appearance for the funeral of Dot Cotton (June Brown) on 12 December 2022.

Ian is the most-married character in EastEnders history, with six marriages to five women (Cindy Williams, Mel Healy, Laura Dunn, twice to Jane Collins, and Sharon Watts) and two aborted engagements to Mandy Salter and Denise Fox. Ian is the owner of 45 Albert Square, traditionally represented within the series as the family home of the Beale and Fowler family, and in 2020 he bought the Queen Victoria Pub for Sharon Watts (Letitia Dean).

Storylines 
As a teenager, Ian argues with his father Pete Beale (Peter Dean) over his desire to become a caterer but his grandmother Lou Beale (Anna Wing) encourages him. He starts several businesses and buys a local café soon after graduating from catering college. Ian has several failed romances, including with his childhood friend, Sharon Watts (Letitia Dean). Sharon becomes interested in Simon Wicks (Nick Berry), who was believed to be Ian's half-brother, but they remain close friends. When his cousin Michelle falls pregnant, he is initially suspected to be the father by Pete and Kathy. He starts a relationship with Tina Hopkins (Eleanor Rhodes) and the pair decide to move in together, renting one of Kelvin Carpenter's (Paul J. Medford) father Tony Carpenter's (Oscar James) flats. Ian eventually loses his virginity to her, to his glee. Ian and Tina break up when Tina's parents make an unannounced visit and are unhappy with their living conditions, so they take Tina to Ilford. Ian's uncle Kenny Beale (Michael Attwell) and cousin Elizabeth Beale (Lucy Bayler) visit from New Zealand and Ian and Elizabeth taking a liking to each other, but they break up when Elizabeth constantly flirts with men and she returns home. Ian begins to develop a relationship with Donna Ludlow (Matilda Ziegler), not knowing she is his half-sister until his mother Kathy Beale (Gillian Taylforth) tells him she was raped as a teenager and gave Donna up for adoption.

Ian gets engaged to Cindy Williams (Michelle Collins) in 1989; however, a one-night stand with Simon leaves her pregnant. Cindy marries Ian and claims that the baby she is expecting, Steven Beale, is his, resulting in Ian attempting suicide when he learns the truth. He recovers and causes Simon to have a car accident in revenge so Simon, Cindy and Steven leave Walford together. Ian immerses himself in his catering business but his exploitative working practices alienate his friends, employees and family. He and Cindy later reconcile and Ian is overjoyed to become a father to twins, Peter (Ben Hardy) and Lucy Beale (Melissa Suffield/Hetti Bywater). After opening a fish and chip shop, Ian becomes so obsessed with building his business empire that he neglects Cindy, who decides to leave him for his half-brother, David Wicks (Michael French). Ian wins custody of their children, and makes Cindy so miserable that she hires John Valecue (Steve Weston), a hitman to kill him. Ian is shot but is only clipped by the bullet and recovers. Cindy leaves the country with Steven and Peter and spends a year in Italy before Ian traces them and retrieves the boys. Cindy returns to Walford and wins back custody of the children but is implicated in Ian's shooting. She is jailed on remand and dies several months later in prison during childbirth.

Ian has a serious romance with Mel Healy (Tamzin Outhwaite), the manager of his bric-a-brac shop. She proposes to him but later cheats on him with Steve Owen (Martin Kemp). Suspecting that she is planning to leave him, Ian manipulates her by falsely claiming that Lucy is dying from lymphoma. They marry in 1999, but she leaves him during their wedding reception after discovering that Lucy is fine. Ian then pursues a new business venture: development of high-market flats. He begins a casual relationship with his nanny, Laura Dunn (Hannah Waterman), but only commits to her after being declared bankrupt. Laura buys back the fish and chip shop and, despite fearing that Ian is only interested in an inheritance she has received, they marry in May 2001. Their marriage deteriorates when Ian attempts to kiss Mel. He refuses to have a child with Laura, who frequently belittles him. Steven learns that Ian has been visiting local prostitute Janine Butcher (Charlie Brooks), and tells Laura, before moving to New Zealand to live with Simon. Laura forgives Ian on the condition that they have a baby. Although he agrees, Ian has a secret vasectomy and throws Laura out when she becomes pregnant later that year after conning her into signing over control of their businesses.

Laura's son Bobby (Kevin Curran) requires a blood transfusion shortly after his birth, making Laura realise that Ian must be his father, as her lover Garry Hobbs (Ricky Groves) is not a match. Laura dies in 2004, breaking her neck after falling down the stairs. Ian takes custody of Bobby and also takes in his half-brother Ben Mitchell, following the death of their mother. Ian fights Ben's father Phil Mitchell (Steve McFadden) for custody, worsening their long-standing enmity which stems from Phil's disastrous marriage to Ian's mother Kathy. Ian meets a new romantic interest, Jane Collins (Laurie Brett), in 2004. He helps her to come to terms with the death of her husband, David Collins (Dan Milne) from Huntington's disease, and, although their relationship is severely tested when Jane has a brief affair with Phil's brother, Grant Mitchell (Ross Kemp), they marry in July 2007. Steven returns to Walford and stalks Ian, escalating to holding him hostage for several weeks. He accidentally shoots Jane during an altercation, which results in her needing a hysterectomy. Ian forgives Steven but banishes him from his life when he helps Lucy run away. Ian and Jane temporarily separate over Ian's reluctance to adopt a child. When Lucy falls pregnant, she suggests that Jane raise the baby as her own. Jane and Ian agree but he secretly helps Lucy to have an abortion, lying to Jane that she miscarried. Jane later learns the truth and decides to steal Ian's money and leave him. Ian arranges for her to adopt Bobby, and is devastated to discover Jane's plans. Although she decides to remain with him, Ian begins an affair with Glenda Mitchell (Glynis Barber), who later blackmails Ian, forcing him to confess the adultery to Jane. A disgusted Peter leaves Walford and joins Lucy in Devon. Jane and Ian divorce but continue to live together; however, their acrimony upsets Bobby and Jane leaves Walford in May 2011 as a result. Ian attempts to move on by filling an urn with cigarette ash, pretending that he is a widower and that the ashes are Jane in order to gain attention from women. However, his ruse is soon uncovered.

Feeling dejected, Ian goes to a strip club in August 2011 and is stunned to see Mandy Salter (Nicola Stapleton) being thrown out. Ian helps Mandy out and allows her to stay with him. Mandy helps Ian discover his more frivolous side and he realises he has feelings for her. They begin a relationship, realising that they both yearn for someone to love them, and Mandy accepts Ian's impromptu marriage proposal. Following the death of relative Pat Evans (Pam St Clement), Ian's daughter Lucy returns to Walford, angry at Ian for not telling her about Pat's death. She decides to move in with her father and takes a disliking to Mandy. The relationship is marred by Mandy's one-night stand with Ricky Butcher (Sid Owen), Ian's insecurities, interference from Mandy's abusive mother Lorraine Stevens (Victoria Alcock), and Lucy's hatred of Mandy. Despite Lucy's best efforts to split them up, Ian is determined to marry Mandy and brings their wedding day forward. Mandy is horrified, however, when Ian chooses her over Lucy and throws his daughter out. Realising she does not love Ian, Mandy leaves him in May 2012, leading to Ian suffering a nervous breakdown.  He wanders along a road barefoot, dressed only in pyjamas, not telling anyone where he has gone.

Two months later, Lauren Branning (Jacqueline Jossa), working with homeless people, sees Ian at a tramp shelter. Tanya Cross (Jo Joyner), Max Branning (Jake Wood) and Alfie Moon (Shane Richie) find him and bring him back to the Square but Lucy is unsympathetic, angered by his leaving her and Bobby, and slams the door in his face. Ian refuses to acknowledge anyone. He stays with Tanya and Max until Phil finds out he is back and takes him to his house to ensure he does not tell anybody about Ben murdering Heather. Ian continues to be unresponsive until Phil's partner Shirley Carter (Linda Henry) mentions Heather, and his memory returns. Ben attempts to help Ian by taking him to the café, but Lucy screams and has him physically removed. Ian, extremely miserable, collapses in tears outside, while Phil worries that Ian will remember that Ben murdered Heather. After Sharon returns to Walford, she successfully persuades Lucy to give Ian another chance. Lucy agrees but on the condition that Ian signs all of his businesses over to her so that if Ian abandons her again she can be financially secure.  Ian agrees to this. Ben confesses to murdering Heather and is remanded in custody, leaving Ian shocked. He starts working again at the café and getting back into his old life. Phil then gets Ian to visit Ben in prison to try to get him to retract his confession, but Ian says he cannot tell Ben what is right. Eventually, Zainab Khan (Nina Wadia) persuades Ian to attend counselling in an attempt to recover from his mental breakdown and, after talking to Sharon, Lucy finally makes peace with her father.

Ian sparks a friendly rivalry with Denise Fox (Diane Parish) as the two engage in a fruit-selling war, though he irritates her. Denise's sister, Kim Fox (Tameka Empson), attempts to set them up on a date but this upsets Denise, who kisses Kim's boyfriend Ray Dixon (Chucky Venn). Kim discovers this and disowns her sister, so Ian allows Denise to stay with him, igniting a friendship between them. It eventually leads to a relationship when he confides in her about his life on the streets. Ian decides to open a restaurant, though Lucy is worried it will fail because of his mental illness. He runs out of money for construction but then finds a box of cash that used to belong to Derek Branning (Jamie Foreman). He also gets Janine to invest in the restaurant, and eventually tricks Lucy into signing over all of the businesses to him. Peter (now played by Ben Hardy) returns to live with the family, and is soon followed by Cindy Williams (Mimi Keene), the daughter of Ian's dead ex-wife of the same name. Ian lets Cindy stay, and Denise also moves in with the family. However Carl White (Daniel Coonan), an associate of Derek, arrives in Walford and soon works out that Ian has spent Derek's money. Carl claims the money was his, and so extorts large sums of cash from Ian as payback. Carl is violent, and burns Ian's hand when he tries to refuse to pay him before promising that the debt will be paid if Ian lies in court, and says that he saw Max tampering with the brakes of Carl's car. Ian reluctantly agrees, but on the day of the court case he is kidnapped by Phil, and Max is found not guilty. It is then revealed that Max was in on the kidnapping, but it was just to lure Carl into a trap. Ian then has to face the consequences of his actions, and Denise is angry when she finds out the truth.

Denise thinks that Ian is planning to propose to her as a Christmas present, but he denies it even though he has bought an engagement ring. Peter reveals that he is in a relationship with Lola Pearce (Danielle Harold), the mother of Phil's granddaughter and Ian's niece, Lexi Pearce. Phil threatens Ian and forces him to end the relationship. Ian tells Peter this, and Peter tells Ian that he has found £10,000 that Cindy stole from Phil. They return the money, and Phil blames Ian, believing that he put Cindy up to stealing it. In January 2014, just as Ian is about to propose to Denise, Jane arrives unannounced. Jane later buys into Ian's restaurant and they begin running it together, leading Ian to harbour feelings for Jane.

Ian is pessimistic when Lucy decides to set up her own property business and later becomes concerned about her when he discovers she is sleeping with Lee Carter (Danny-Boy Hatchard) and is taking cocaine. He confronts her and admits she is the child he is most proud of, but this is overheard by Peter, resulting in Lucy storming out. Ian tries to contact her when she does not return home that night, but is later informed by DC Emma Summerhayes (Anna Acton) and DS Cameron Bryant (Glen Wallace) that Lucy has been found dead. He identifies her body and then shares his devastating news with Jane, Denise, Cindy, Bobby and finally Peter. Struggling with their grief, Ian and Jane share a passionate encounter, giving Ian hope that they might reunite. When Jane dashes his hopes, Ian takes his anger out on Bobby and Jane decides it would be best if she take Bobby away for a while. Cindy also leaves the Square to return to Devon with her aunt, Gina Williams. Increasingly alone, Ian leans on Phil for support and questions how he can move on from his daughter's death. With Peter's help, he stages an opening for the new and improved restaurant, but during opening night Summerhayes reveals that Lucy's body has been released for burial. Ian leaves early with Peter to see her, but is unable due to his grief. He wants to organise the funeral for as soon as possible but discovers that Max and Lucy were together; Ian angrily attacks Max as he carries Lucy's coffin down the aisle of the church and it is clear that Ian is not coping. Worried, Sharon believes that he is relying on pills to numb the pain of his grief and she and Carol Jackson (Lindsey Coulson) comfort him.

Ian receives texts from Rainie Cross (Tanya Franks) that he hides from Denise. It is later discovered that he paid Rainie for sex on the night Lucy died, and, knowing that he has given a false alibi to the police, Rainie demands money to fund her drug addiction. When Ian cannot pay Rainie, she comes to Walford and tells Patrick Trueman (Rudolph Walker) what Ian did. Patrick confronts Ian and decides to tell Denise so Ian arranges a surprise trip to see Denise's daughter Libby Fox (Belinda Owusu) in Oxford, and they leave before Patrick can tell Denise. Patrick suffers a stroke and he is unable to communicate what happened to Denise. Ian meets Rainie at her request but Mick Carter (Danny Dyer) sees them together. When Ian drives away, Rainie approaches Mick who is then arrested and charged for soliciting a prostitute.

Ian tries to convince Denise to put Patrick in a care home, fearful of his secret. However, he eventually agrees that Patrick can live with them. Rainie tells Denise the truth, but before Ian can explain to Denise, Cindy makes a sudden return, already several hours into her labour. Ian delivers her baby daughter, and agrees that she can live with him. Denise moves out, refusing to forgive Ian for his actions when she discovers that Patrick knew and that Ian was willing to put Patrick in a care home to keep his secret. Concerned for Ian, Sharon and Phil organise for him to visit Michelle in America. Ian returns on Sharon's wedding day to try to stop her marrying Phil. Jane returns with the news that Bobby is missinghe is found on Walford Commonhe wants to return to Walford and Jane agrees. She falls for Ian again and proposes to him at the Christmas Eve carol concert. They plan their wedding for next February.

Ian and Jane get married in the restaurant with their friends and family as witnesses. After Lauren tells Peter that she believes Lucy was murdered by a member of the family, he accuses them of killing Lucy. Jane admits that Bobby accidentally killed Lucy by hitting her over the head with a jewellery box.  Though Bobby believed that Lucy was still alive, Jane realized she was dead and covered up her murder by faking a mugging. Ian, Jane and Cindy decide to cover up Lucy's murder however Peter does not agree to do this. Ian, Jane, Bobby and Beth go on holiday for Ian and Jane's honeymoon, and Peter leaves Walford along with Lauren. A few weeks later, Ian and the rest of the Beales return to Walford and reunite Beth with Cindy, but Cindy believes that she is not a capable mother and abandons Beth at the park, but she is picked up by Ian's great nephew Liam Butcher (James Forde). Ian and Jane agree to adopt Beth, but Cindy decides she does not want to be in the same house as her baby, so says that if she is not adopted into a different household, she will tell everyone Bobby killed Lucy. After Beth is taken in by her paternal relatives, Ian tells Cindy to leave and not come back. Jane pays Carol to look after Cindy and Ian finds out from Carol after an argument with her. On the day of Cindy's school prom, Ian reveals this to Cindy. After Cindy gets into a car with two strange men, feeling she has no home, a concerned Ian phones the police. After Cindy returns, Ian tries to convince her she is wanted and Liam convinces her to give her family a chance, so she and Ian make up. Ian and Jane are upset to learn about a new lead in the murder investigation but they still plan silence even after Ben is arrested in the hope that he is released. However, when Max is arrested and charged for the murder, Jane begins to contemplate telling the truth when she feels guilty for not being able to help Carol prove Max's innocence. Ian is adamant that Bobby's role in the murder will not be made public and confronts Sharon when she discovers the truth. Max is found guilty and sentenced to 21 years in prison.

Ian puts Bobby in a private school, hoping that it will help with his anger problems. However, to pay for it, Ian decides to sell his restaurant to a supermarket chain, causing the locals to protest. Ian eventually decides not to sell, meaning Bobby must leave the school, even though he is happy there and doing well. Bobby overhears Jane talking about Bobby leaving the school and when she stops him going back to the school, he hits her over the head with his hockey stick three times, leaving her in a critical condition. He tells Ian in the pub that he has killed Jane, just like he killed Lucy, within earshot of everyone in the pub. After Bobby is questioned about the assault, he confesses to the police that he killed Lucy. They are reluctant to reopen the case but Ian is horrified when Bobby says he still has the murder weapon.

Bobby is charged with unlawful killing and denied bail. He is sent to a youth detention centre until his next hearing the following week. Ian then goes to see Jane in hospital, where she tells him she knows about Steven returning and the Beale family is better off without her, ending her and Ian's relationship. Bobby is sentenced to three years custody. A week later, after visiting Bobby in prison and telling him not to appeal his sentence, Ian receives a threatening note from Max, saying that he will never forget what Ian did. Ian worries when Max returns, but Max tells him and Jane that he has forgiven them. Ian is thrilled when Michelle returns. He starts to worry about his health when he has a medical checkup and he is told that his BMI is high. Michelle crashes her car into Ian's fish and chip shop, for which he has no buildings insurance. Max's employer eventually purchases the chip shop, despite it arousing Ian's suspicions.

Ian and Jane are devastated to hear that Steven has a brain tumour, but he has been lying about this in a desperate attempt to stay with Lauren. Jane discovers Steven's lie and that Max has not really forgiven them and is secretly planning revenge. In a bid to get rid of Jane, Max forces Steven to kill her. As a result, Steven sets fire to the restaurant, trapping Jane inside. Steven tries to save Jane, but is violently shoved into a table by Max, who leaves Jane to die. However, while Jane is rescued, Steven dies from a liver bleed. Ian, Kathy and Lauren are shocked when they learn that Steven did not really have a brain tumour. After Jane comes out of her coma, Max forces her to leave Walford with Ian, but James Willmott-Brown (William Boyde), who is working with Max, orders Max to ensure that Ian remains in Walford, so Max blackmails Jane into leaving Walford alone. Ian allows Lauren and Louie to move back in with him and tells Lauren's sister, Abi Branning's (Lorna Fitzgerald), about making Beales into a franchise to pass onto Louie, so Abi tells him that she is pregnant with Steven's baby, but Ian does not take the news well. Later, Lauren warns Ian to watch his back as Max may be out for revenge, and a broken Max visits Ian and says he will kill him and Phil for making him suffer in prison. Ian tries to escape but Max attempts to strangle Ian with fairy lights as Lauren and Louie come home. On Christmas Day, Tanya returns to Walford and reveals to Stacey and Abi that Jane told her that Max killed Steven, news which Abi relays to Lauren, Kathy and Ian. Ian attacks Max in the street but Max overpowers and punches him.

In February 2020, Ian discovers that Sharon's teenage son, Dennis Rickman Jnr (Bleu Landau), has been bullying Bobby for his faith, which results in Bobby being hospitalised, following an Islamophobic attack. Enraged, Ian confronts Dennis during The Queen Vic boat party and angrily locks him in a cabin following a bitter row. However, when Phil and Keanu's fight leads the boat to crash, Ian instantly goes to rescue Dennis; despite Ian's best efforts, Dennis dies and Ian is left feeling guilty. Dotty Cotton (Milly Zero) knows Ian imprisoned Denny and blackmails Ian, although she changes her mind at the funeral, she tries to persuade Ian to be brave enough to confess. 

Ian develops feelings for Sharon and he uses Max's money to buy The Queen Vic for her. However, his feelings are not reciprocated. He steals money from a charity set up by Bobby in order to try and frame Max for fraud. Ian is attacked in The Vic by Phil who was asked to do so after Sharon learns about Ian's role in Dennis’ death. Sharon and Kathy rush him to hospital where they learn he has a bleed on his brain. Fearing he is going to die, Ian proposes to Sharon who accepts his proposal. Kathy asks Sharon to get the marriage annulled, but she disagrees and vows to be there for Ian. After Phil fails to kill Ian because of Phil saying that Ian will always be family, Sharon mixes lithium into Ian's Christmas pudding to poison him. Later, Phil changes his mind and agrees to help Sharon murder Ian and they plan to make it look as if Ian has committed suicide, with Phil buying cocaine for Sharon to mix into his dinner after planning a romantic evening. However, Ian finds out the truth and confronts Sharon about her plan to kill him, just before he is about to eat her poisoned pasta. Sharon reveals she knows about his part in Dennis' death and calls him weak and cowardly. She adds that Ian is a hated man and that he deserves to die. A devastated Ian agrees and starts to eat the poisoned food. Willing to let him die at first, Sharon has a change of heart and makes Ian throw up the food, thereby saving his life. She ends her marriage to him and goes to Phil, telling him if he wants Ian dead so desperately, he will have to kill Ian himself. By the time Phil reaches The Vic, Ian has left the Square. Off-screen, Ian later sends Sharon an annulment and makes her the sole owner of the pub, although Sharon returns the Vic to Mick and Linda Carter (Kellie Bright) a few days later.

Nearly two years later, Ian returns to Walford, and is seen hiding in the bushes outside a church, watching Dot Cotton’s (June Brown) coffin be carried inside on the day of her funeral. He is tearful and utters to himself: ‘Goodbye Dot. I’ll miss you’. He then answers a call from his new partner and returns home. He is not seen by any of the other funeral goers.

Creation and development

Creation 
Ian Beale is one of the original 23 characters written by the creators of EastEnders, Tony Holland and Julia Smith. Ian is a member of the first family of EastEnders, the Beales and Fowlers, and Holland took the inspiration for some of the series' earliest characters from his own London family and background. Ian's original character outline as written by Smith and Holland appeared in an abridged form in their book, EastEnders: The Inside Story.

Because the actress playing Ian's mother Kathy (Gillian Taylforth) was fair-haired, they also wanted him to be fair, and because of Taylforth's age he also had to look very young. Ian was meant to be 14 years old when the programme first aired, but because of licensing regulations, the actor cast was required to be a 16-year-old who could "play down". Adam Woodyatt, born in East London, had worked as an actor in his youth, but had given it up and relocated with his family to Wales. He was recruited from his old agency and it was decided that he was perfect for the part and he was subsequently cast as Ian Beale. In 1990 Ian's age was increased and he celebrated his 21st birthday two years after his 18th. The producers felt Ian needed to be a bit older and more mature for storylines planned for him later that year.

Longevity 
Ian has gone on to be the longest running character in the soap's history. Woodyatt confirmed his desire to remain with the show in 2010, during the show's 25th anniversary: "Why would I want to leave when I'm not going to get the chance to portray even half the range of emotions I get to here in a one-off drama or a six-part series? And you're not going to get the same viewing figures either. You have your moments when things go wrong and you perhaps don't want to work with a certain person. In any office there are going to be people who don't get along but you get on with it and on the whole I enjoy it. Over the last couple of years we've had a really tight crew and it's the best atmosphere I can remember. There have been peaks and troughs, like with any show, but right now things are good."

Characterisation 
Ian has been described as a character viewers love to hate. His initial storylines portrayed him as a sensitive young boy with professional aspirations that went against his father's wishes. Not content to follow in his father's footsteps and take over the family fruit and veg stall, Ian wanted to become a chef and this caused a certain amount of hostility between him and his father, who viewed the occupation as effeminate. Ian's keenness to succeed in his business ventures continued as the character grew, so much so that he started using underhand methods in order to get what he wanted and became one of the soap's most renowned "slimeballs". The character is regularly referred to as a "weasel" in the British press.

Author Dorothy Hobson has described Ian as a typical Thatcher's child, a term used to reference children who grew up under the Conservative government of the 1980s and who adopted an ideology, such as personal financial gain, self-sufficiency and disregard of the welfare of those who are less well-off. As a result, Hobson suggests that Ian is "young, ambitious, rich and unhappy", which she claims is a perfect reflection of the spirit of the age.

In her book, Who's Who?, Kate Lock described Ian as "wimpy, perhaps not what you'd call a man's man [...] trying to turn Walford into the capital of Capitalism [...] Somewhere along the line, Ian evolved into an obsessive, obnoxious money-monster [...] Ian always pretended to be magnanimous, doing things for the community [...] but it's inspired by self-interest."

Hobson suggests that Ian's saving grace is that he is a "passionately caring father" and Woodyatt has suggested that Ian is a chameleon, a description he claims former Executive Producer Louise Berridge used to describe the character. Woodyatt commented in 2010, "Whatever [Louise Berridge] wanted Ian to do, she'd find a way of justifying it. It's true. He can be nice to his family but he can be devious with them as well. He can stitch people up but can be very generous. You can get away with doing anything with Ian. It's probably why I'm still here."

Cindy Beale 
Obsession with success has been an underlying theme with the character for almost the entire duration of the show, but the acceleration of Ian's nasty side can be traced back to his disastrous first marriage to one of EastEnders' most renowned women, Cindy Beale in 1989. The storyline centred on Ian's discovery that the child he thought was his (Steven), was actually fathered by his best friend, Simon Wicks. The climax of this revelation was known to script-writers as the "Devon cottage climax" and aired in September 1990. The episode saw an enraged Ian trace Cindy and Simon to her parents' house in Devon, just after being released from hospital following a suicide attempt. The script, written by Debbie Cook, led to a confrontation that EastEnders' writer Colin Brake has suggested contained elements of tragedy and farce. Brake suggests that a particularly memorable scene included Ian furiously throwing bricks through the window of the house, followed by one of his crutches. The episode ended ominously with Ian finding Cindy's father's shotgun and stealing it. Directed by Matthew Evans, Brake suggests that these episodes not only brought the story to a shocking climax but also laid roots for the next three months' worth of storylines, building up to Cindy and Simon's departure, and Ian's spectacular fall from grace.

Author Dorothy Hobson has described Ian and Cindy's relationship as "one of the most tempestuous in any soap opera". The characters were reunited on-screen in 1992 but the relationship ended in adultery once again when Cindy began an affair with Simon's brother and Ian's half-brother, David Wicks, which culminated in Cindy hiring an assassin to shoot Ian in 1996 after he discovered the affair. Michelle Collins who played Cindy commented in 1996, "[Cindy] was not thinking properly when she contacted the hitman, and she is being quite erratic. Despite what she has done she never expected Ian to be so cruel to her. Now she cannot really see any other way out of the mess she is in. She has lost touch with reality – but in the end she can't see any other way of escaping Ian." More than 18 million viewers tuned in to see Ian gunned-down, which was more than sixty-four per cent of available viewers. The plot facilitated Collins' desire to leave the programme following the birth of her child, and Cindy, implicated in the shooting, fled the country with Ian's two sons.

Departure and brief return
In August 2020, it was announced that Woodyatt would be taking an "extended break" from EastEnders. A show insider told Digital Spy that his departure would be "part of a big storyline" and that it is "unclear how long [his break] will be". Ian departed in scenes broadcast on 22 January 2021. In May 2021, Woodyatt made an appearance on The One Show, where he was asked how long his break would last. Woodyatt explained that he is starring in a theatre production until October 2021 and would then be attending his daughter's wedding in America; he did not know a specific date for his character's return, but stated it will be 2022 "at the earliest". In October 2021, he stated that his return will air in mid-2022. However, in November 2021, Woodyatt revealed that he had no plans to return to the show and did not know when or if he would be going back. He made an exception for the on-screen funeral of Dot Cotton in December 2022, following the death of actress June Brown earlier that year.

Reception 

Ian was voted one of the top five television characters "we most love to hate" in a Channel 4 poll in 2001. In 2009, Ian Beale came ninth in a poll by British men's magazine Loaded for "Top Soap Bloke". Woodyatt has received a number of award nominations for his portrayal of Ian, including a "Best Actor" nomination at The British Soap Awards 2010 and a nomination for "Best Performance in a Serial Drama" in The National Television Awards 2012. In 2013, Woodyatt received a "Lifetime Achievement Award" at The British Soap Awards. Following thirty years of service to EastEnders, Woodyatt was awarded with his first "Best Actor" accolade at The British Soap Awards 2015. At this ceremony, he also won "Best On-screen Partnership" alongside Laurie Brett.

Author Dorothy Hobson has stated that Ian Beale is a "major creation" capturing the personification of political attitudes taken up during the Conservative government of the 1980s. She suggests that Ian Beale is a "major representation of a young man" of that era, and that his sensitive portrayal by Adam Woodyatt is "perhaps unrecognised". Roz Paterson of the Daily Record branded Ian "eminently unlovable" and stated that Melanie proposing to him represented a growing trend in women proposing. Holy Soap said that Ian's most memorable moment was "His attempted murder in the Square". In 2009, Virgin Media called Ian "the most boring and selfish man in Walford" and felt that he deserved to lose his wife, Jane.

See also 
 List of EastEnders characters (1985)
 List of EastEnders: E20 characters
 List of soap opera villains
 "Who Killed Lucy Beale?"
 "Who Killed Archie?"
 "Who Shot Phil?"

Notes

References

External links 
 

Television characters introduced in 1985
Fictional businesspeople
Fictional shopkeepers
Fictional chefs
Fictional politicians
Fictional market stallholders
Fictional murderers
Fictional murderers of children
Fictional attempted suicides
Fictional homeless people
Fictional prisoners and detainees
Male characters in television
Beale family (EastEnders)
Male villains
Teenage characters in television
Fictional characters with psychiatric disorders
Fictional thieves
Fictional bartenders